Idiomarina baltica is a bacterium from the genus of Idiomarina which has been isolated from water from the Baltic Sea.

References

Bacteria described in 2003
Alteromonadales